Julius Momoh Gulama (born Julius Foday Cole, 1893 – 8 March 1951) was a Sierra Leonean paramount chief, statesman and educator in the preindependence era. As paramount chief of Kaiyamba Chiefdom, he ruled the largest and most powerful Mende chiefdom in the Sierra Leone.

Gulama was a founding member of two key organizations that worked towards independence for Sierra Leone: the Protectorate Educational Progressive Union (PEPU) and the Sierra Leone Organizational Society (SOS). When Sierra Leone became independent, both organizations merged to form the Sierra Leone People's Party (SLPP).

He was the father of Ella Koblo Gulama and Komeh Gulama Lansana.

Early life and education
He was born Julius Foday Cole in Moyamba, Moyamba District in the Southern Province of British Sierra Leone to Mende Paramount Chief Momoh Gulama of Kaiyamba Chiefdom and Talla, his Temne wife.

He received his primary school education at the EUB School at Rotifunk and graduated secondary school at Albert Academy in Freetown.

Heir presumptive
It was understood in Moyamba that he would one day succeed his father Momoh Gulama as paramount chief.

Prior to his reign, he taught at Harford School for Girls in Moyamba. He also worked as a ticket master for the Sierra Leone Railway Department and was a clerk in the Kamerun campaign during World War I and a clerk at the Peterson Zochonis firm in Moyamba.

Reign
His reign as paramount chief of Kaiyamba Chiefdom began in 1928. He assumed the regnal name "Julius Momoh Gulama".

Gulama is regarded as one of the Founding Fathers and Mothers of Sierra Leone.

The Sierra Leone Organization Society
Gulama was a founding member of the Sierra Leone Organization Society (SOS), a political association formed with the aim of achieving independence for Sierra Leone. The association consisted of a group of educated protectorate Sierra Leoneans including John Karefa-Smart, Siaka Stevens, J.D.Manley and Doyle Sumner.

Sierra Leone People's Party
In 1951, the Sierra Leone Organization Society (SOS) united with the Protectorate Educational Progressive Union (PEPU) to form the Sierra Leone People's Party (SLPP). Gulama was a founding member of the new political party.

It was chaired by Sir Milton Margai and the deputy leader was Chief Bai Farima Tass II.

Public perception and character
Gulama is regarded as one of the Founding Fathers and Mothers of the Sierra Leone People's Party.

His reign was distinguished by his efforts to unite Sierra Leoneans of all ethnic groups together. He was a passionate advocate of education in Sierra Leone and he helped establish the Bo Government School.

Issue

Marriage and family
Gulama was married to Lucy and had three children Samuel, Ella and Komeh. It is the tradition of paramount chief's in Sierra Leone to practice polygamy and have so-called "junior" wives. From Gulama's junior wife, Lunia, he fathered two more daughters Messy and Yebu.

Gulama was progressive and supported gender equality. He promoted education for women and girls in his chiefdom and led by example by having his daughter Ella accompany him to the Council of Chiefs and Protectorate Assembly Meetings.

Ancestry

Further reading
 Momoh Gulama
 Lucy Gulama
 Ella Koblo Gulama
 Komeh Gulama Lansana
 David Lansana

External links
The life and Times of Honourable PC Madam Ella Koblo Gulama of Sierra Leone By Awareness Times, September 26, 2006
Tribute to the Honourable PC Ella Koblo Gulama, Sierra Connection
Women Leaders In Africa

References

1956 deaths
African royalty
Sierra Leonean nobility
Sierra Leonean royalty
Sierra Leone People's Party politicians
1893 births
People from Moyamba District